Greece was represented by 18 athletes at the 1994 European Athletics Championships held in Helsinki, Finland.

Medals

Results

References

http://www.sansimera.gr/articles/804

1994
Nations at the 1994 European Athletics Championships
1994 in Greek sport